= Car ferry =

A car ferry may be:

- In North American usage, a ferry carrying rail vehicles
- In UK usage, a ferry carrying automobiles and other road vehicles
